Catesby may refer to:

Places
 Catesby, Northamptonshire, England, a civil parish
 Catesby, Oklahoma, United States, an unincorporated community

People
 Catesby (surname)
 Catesby ap Roger Jones (1821–1877), American Civil War naval commander
 R. Catesby Taliaferro (1907–1989), American mathematician, science historian, classical philologist, philosopher and translator of ancient Greek and Latin works
 Robert Catesby (1572-1605), English catholic and leader of the 1605 Gunpowder plot.

See also
 Lower Catesby and Upper Catesby, two hamlets in Catesby, Northamptonshire
 Catesby Priory, in Lower Catesby, a former priory of Cistercian nuns
 Catesby Tunnel, a disused railway tunnel in Northamptonshire
 Catesby's snail-eater, a species of non-venomous snake
 Sistrurus miliarius, a species of venomous snake also known as Catesby's small snake